The ÖBB 4030 is a 3-car electric multiple unit used by the ÖBB for regional rail passenger transport, especially on the Vienna S-Bahn.

From 1979 onwards the 4030 was gradually replaced by the ÖBB 4020, the last trains were retired in 2004. A 4030.2 unit has been preserved and is on display at the railway museum in Schwechat.

References
http://www.schnellbahn-wien.at/allgemein/4030.htm

Austrian Federal Railways electric multiple units
15 kV AC multiple units